Al-Ḥuṣayn ibn Numayr al-Sakūnī (died 5/6 August 686) was a leading general of the early Umayyad Caliphate, from the Sakun subtribe of the Kinda.

Biography 
A man of his name is recorded as being responsible for the pacification of Hadramawt in 632, during the Ridda Wars, but most scholars reject an identity with the Umayyad general. Husayn is first securely attested at the Battle of Siffin in 657, where he fought for the Umayyads. He is also mentioned as the leader of summer raids into Byzantine Asia Minor in 678 and 681/682. 

Under Yazid I ( 680–683) he became governor of the Jund Hims (military district of Homs), and in this capacity served in the expedition sent against the rebellion in Medina and Mecca in 683, under the command of Muslim ibn Uqba. After Muslim's death, he succeeded him in command of the campaign and laid siege to Ibn al-Zubayr in Mecca for two months. It was during this siege that the Kaaba burned down. Husayn maintained the siege for two months, until news reached him of Yazid's death. He then offered to recognize Ibn al-Zubayr as Caliph, provided that he would come to Syria, but when the latter refused, Husayn turned his army back.

Back in Syria, he played an important role in securing the Umayyad family's nomination of the experienced, though elderly, Marwan ibn al-Hakam as Caliph, instead of Yazid's young son Khalid. The leading Umayyad commander, Ubayd Allah ibn Ziyad, then sent him to the Jazira, where, on 6 January 685, he defeated the Shi'a sect of the Penitents at the Battle of Ayn al-Warda. Husayn also participated in the attempted reconquest of Iraq under Ubayd Allah ibn Ziyad, and like him, fell at the Battle of Khazir on 5 or 6 August 686.

His son, Yazid ibn Husayn, also fought for the Umayyads in the Second Civil War and served as governor of Hims for Umar II ( 717–720), while his grandson Mu'awiya also served as governor of Hims for Yazid III ( 743–744), but went over to Marwan II ( 744–750) during the Third Civil War.

References

Sources 
 
 

686 deaths
Medieval Arabs killed in battle
Umayyad people of the Arab–Byzantine wars
People of the Second Fitna
Arab generals
Generals of the Umayyad Caliphate
Umayyad governors of Hims
Year of birth unknown
Kinda
7th-century people from the Umayyad Caliphate